Deceit (foaled May 3, 1968, in Kentucky) was an American Thoroughbred racemare bred by Leslie Combs II and Charles H. Wacker III, and owned by E. P. Taylor's Windfields Farm. Deceit was sired by Prince John, a four-time leading broodmare sire in North America, and out of the mare Double Agent, a daughter of Double Jay who was the 1946 American Champion Two-Year-Old Colt and also a four-time leading broodmare sire in North America.

Trained by Del Carroll, Deceit  raced successfully from age two to four, winning several of the important U.S. northeast races for her gender including the Astarita and Fashion Stakes at age two and the first two legs of the Triple Tiara, the Acorn and Mother Goose Stakes at three.

Dam of a Champion
When her racing career ended, Deceit was sent to stand at the Windfields Farm Maryland division. She was bred first to E. P. Taylor's  super-stallion, Northern Dancer then to other important stallions such as Herbager, Graustark, The Minstrel, Nijinsky, Assert and Deputy Minister, among others. However, it was a match with Taylor's Vice Regent which produced Deceit Dancer, the 1984 Canadian Champion Two-Year-Old Filly.

Deceit was buried at E.P. Taylors Oshawa Ontario Windfields Farm which is now defunct.   The status of the gravesite area, shared with other important Windfields horses, remains in question since a residential subdivision is to be built in close proximity to the gravesite area.

Pedigree

References

1968 racehorse births
Racehorses bred in Kentucky
Racehorses trained in the United States
Thoroughbred family 18